Out of Season is a 1975 British drama film directed by Alan Bridges, and starring Vanessa Redgrave, Susan George, and Cliff Robertson. It was produced by Lorimar Productions and entered into the 25th Berlin International Film Festival.

Out of Season was filmed at Elstree Studios in Borehamwood, Hertfordshire, and on location in Dorset, primarily at the Isle of Portland. The sets were designed by the art director Robert Jones. The film was originally titled Winter Rates and was announced by Daily Variety in 1974 to be starring Redgrave and Oliver Reed. It had an expected budget of approximately $500,000.

Plot
Joe Turner (Cliff Robertson) returns to Great Britain twenty years after he ended a romantic relationship with Ann (Vanessa Redgrave). He discovers her running the same hotel in a picturesque seaside resort in Dorset, but now with a grown daughter named Joanna (Susan George). Joe and Ann attempt to renew their relationship, but with interference from Joanna, who flirts with Joe from the moment she meets him and successfully competes with her mother for his attention.

Days into Joe's return, an argument with Ann leads to him leaving, but Joanna follows him in the car and asks him to stay, and he returns to the hotel. That evening, Joe unexpectedly discovers one of the women (whose face cannot be seen) offering herself to him in his bedroom, and he wordlessly accepts her invitation. The following morning, Joe behaves as if he thinks the woman was Ann, and he and Ann attempt to continue to revive their relationship, but the evening ends with Joanna announcing to the other two that she had been with Joe the previous night. Joe says nothing, but Ann responds by physically dragging Joanna and locking her in her bedroom. Joe agrees with Ann that he will leave for a few weeks, to attend to some business he has in London, and then come back.

After Ann goes to bed, Joanna escapes out of her window and lets herself back into the hotel, where she finds Joe sitting alone downstairs. His initial attempts to send her back to her room fail, and Joe and Joanna succumb to their feelings for each other and have sex. Ann catches them together and coldly informs Joe that he is Joanna's father, as she had previously lied to him when she said Joanna's father was dead.

The next day, one of the women leaves the resort by train, while the other woman remains with Joe at the hotel. Joe talks about fixing the place up before sitting down to play cards with the woman.

Reception
Variety said: "Virtually a three-hander, Out of Season boasts top-notch performances by Redgrave, Robertson and George, a taut script and first-rate direction. Bridges displays his ability to develop and hold obsessive situations, all hints and innuendos, and this ping pong match of the affections often has the suspense of a whodunit." TV Guide awarded the film three stars, commenting: "A small cast in a tight environment makes this film look like exactly what it is - a stage play adapted for the screen." Time Out noted: "The super-smooth Alan Bridges finds himself landed with an impossible project. The dire script wrings every possible cliché out of the situation. The biggest mystery is why this stagey stuff was filmed at all, and why a cast of this calibre should have bothered."

Texas Monthly said: "Out of Season cannot be tolerated at any time of year. If ever a project called for an executioner, this was it, and the presence of Redgrave, Robertson, George and the underrated director Alan Bridges, should not fool anyone into thinking that this frail mash note to father-daughter sex is a Certified Art Film." Film Review Digest Annual wrote: "With Out of Season, it's a shame that so much tender loving care was expended on so uninteresting a film. Whatever it was in Reuben Bercovitch and Eric Bercovici's wan story that intrigued England's gifted Alan Bridges fails to come across."

Cast
 Vanessa Redgrave as Ann
 Cliff Robertson as Joe Turner
 Susan George as Joanna
 Edward Evans as Charlie
 Frank Jarvis as Postman

References

External links

1975 films
1975 drama films
British drama films
Incest in film
Films shot at EMI-Elstree Studios
Films shot in Dorset
Films directed by Alan Bridges
Films scored by John Cameron
1970s English-language films
1970s British films